"(There'll Be Bluebirds Over) The White Cliffs of Dover" is a popular World War II song composed in 1941 by Walter Kent to lyrics by Nat Burton. Made famous in Vera Lynn's 1942 version, it was one of Lynn's best-known recordings and among the most popular World War II tunes.

Background
The song was written about a year after the Royal Air Force and German Luftwaffe aircraft had been fighting over southern England, including the white cliffs of Dover, in the Battle of Britain. Nazi Germany had conquered much of Europe and in 1941 was still bombing Britain. With neither America nor the Soviet Union having yet joined the war, Britain was the only major power fighting the Axis powers in Europe (see The Darkest Hour). The American lyricist, Nat Burton, wrote his lyric (perhaps unaware that the bluebird is not indigenous to Britain, though the migrant Swallow 'Bluebird' is a well known British harbinger of Spring and Summer) and asked Kent to set it to music. Notable phrases include "Thumbs Up!" which was an RAF and RCAF term for permission to go, and "flying in those angry skies" where the air war was taking place. 

The lyrics looked toward a time when the war would be over, and peace would rule over the iconic white cliffs, Britain's symbolic border with the European mainland.

The full song includes two verses rarely found in recordings:

World War II performances
The song was made most famous by Vera Lynn and sung to troops during the war. It was a top ten hit in America for Kate Smith in 1942, and Glenn Miller recorded a version in November 1941.

Jimmie Baker frequently performed it in Europe during the war, and the song was sung by the vocal group The King's Men on a 3 February 1942 episode of the Fibber McGee and Molly Show. Ray Eberle and Tex Beneke also included it in their repertoires.

In 1944, a version was recorded by Louis Prima and his Orchestra.  This version reached number nine on the Harlem Hit Parade chart.

Later performances
The song is the terrace anthem of the supporters of Dover Athletic F.C.

The Checkers, an American group, released an R&B version of the song in 1953 which became very popular. Other artists who have recorded the song include Connie Francis, Bing Crosby, Ray Conniff, Jim Reeves, Acker Bilk, The Righteous Brothers (a hit in the UK Singles Chart), Steeleye Span, Bert Kaempfert and The Hot Sardines on their debut album released in 2014.

In 1995, British pop duo Robson & Jerome recorded the song as part of a double A-side release, coupled with "Unchained Melody"; the single stayed at No. 1 for seven weeks in the UK Singles Chart, selling over a million copies and also making it the number one song with the longest title, including brackets. The Jive Aces released a swing version in 2005 (similar to Acker Bilk's arrangement).

On 18 February 2009, a story in The Daily Telegraph announced that Dame Vera Lynn was suing the British National Party (BNP) for using her version of "The White Cliffs of Dover" on an anti-immigration album without her permission. Lynn's lawyer claimed sales of the song would help boost the BNP's coffers and would link her name to the party's far-right views by association.

On 12 October 2009, Ian Hislop presented a half-hour BBC Radio 4 programme about the song.

On 9 May 2015, Elaine Paige performed the song at VE Day 70: A Party to Remember at Horse Guards Parade in London.

References

1941 songs
1995 singles
Songs of World War II
Songs about the United Kingdom
British patriotic songs
Robson & Jerome songs
Kate Smith songs
Vera Lynn songs
Songs with music by Walter Kent